Abdul Rahman Sifeen (born 12 June 1974) is a Saudi Arabian footballer. He competed in the men's tournament at the 1996 Summer Olympics.

References

External links
 
 

1974 births
Living people
Saudi Arabian footballers
Olympic footballers of Saudi Arabia
Footballers at the 1996 Summer Olympics
Place of birth missing (living people)
Al-Ahli Saudi FC players
Al-Wehda Club (Mecca) players
Saudi Professional League players
Association football forwards